HD 48265 b is an extrasolar planet located approximately 293 light-years away in the constellation of Puppis, orbiting the 8th magnitude G-type main sequence star HD 48265. This planet has a minimum mass of 1.47 times that of Jupiter. Because the inclination is not known, the true mass is not known. This planet orbits at a distance of 1.81 AU with an orbital eccentricity of 0.08.

As part of the NameExoWorlds project of the IAU, HD 48265 b has been named "Naqaỹa" ("brother") and HD 48265 "Nosaxa" ("springtime") in the Moqoit language, as voted by Argentine voters in an online poll.

References

External links
 

Exoplanets discovered in 2008
Giant planets
Puppis
Exoplanets detected by radial velocity
Exoplanets with proper names